Asbridge is an English surname. Notable people with the surname include:

John Asbridge, English clergyman
Jonathan Asbridge, first president of the UK's Nursing and Midwifery Council 
Thomas S. Asbridge, medieval history scholar

See also 
 Ashbridge

English-language surnames